Alexander or Alex Bradley may refer to:

 Alex Bradley (basketball) (born 1959), retired American basketball player
 Alex Bradley (rugby union) (born 1981), New Zealand rugby union footballer
 Alex Bradley (footballer) (born 1999), Finnish footballer
 Alexander Bradley (1851–1925), United States Navy sailor and Medal of Honor recipient